Anne Aaron is a Filipina engineer and the director of video algorithms at Netflix. Her responsibilities include "hiring and managing software engineers and research scientists, strategic decision-making on software architecture and research, project management, and cross-team coordination"

Education
Aaron attended the Philippine Science High School and the Ateneo de Manila University where she received a Bachelor of Science degree in physics in 1998, and another in computer engineering the year after. She then entered Stanford University where she received a PhD in electrical engineering. During these years, Aaron received the AT&T Asia Pacific Leadership Award and C.V. Starr Southeast Asian Fellowship.

Career
After Stanford, Aaron dove into video streaming companies, such as Modulus Video and Dyyno, then followed a stint at Cisco Systems, where she was the engineering lead for video encoding for its FlipShare Video desktop software. She has been working at Netflix since 2011.

Awards
Aaron was recognized as one of the 43 most powerful female engineers of 2017 by Business Insider. In 2018 she was featured among "America's Top 50 Women In Tech" by Forbes.

External links

References

Living people
People in information technology
Netflix people
Stanford University School of Engineering alumni
Ateneo de Manila University alumni
Filipino electrical engineers
21st-century women engineers
21st-century Filipino women
Filipino emigrants to the United States
Year of birth missing (living people)